Bisaat-e-Dil  is a 2018 Pakistani television series produced by Momina Duraid under their banner MD Productions. It is directed by Ali Masud Saeed and written by Amnah Riaz. It features Komal Aziz Khan, Nausheen Ahmed, and Shehroz Sabzwari.

Plot summary 
Bisaat e Dil is the journey of three characters Ania, Sania and Shahnawaz from bad to good circumstances. The serial unfolds that how unexpected and sometimes bad situations come across our and in return different people react differently.

Shahnawaz is the son of a feudal landlord from sindhi background whose father kicks him out of his house after being victim of false allegations of harassment. On the other hand, Ania and Sania are two sisters, having completely different personalities from one another. Sania is ambitious, tries to do better for her family members as his father is a drug addict while Ania is dreamy girl, commends a mistake after falling for a boy that changes her life for ever.

Cast
 Komal Aziz Khan as Ania
 Nausheen Ahmed as Sania
 Shehroz Sabzwari as Shahnawaz
 Anumta Qureshi as Zainab
 Imran Aslam as Mazhar
 Beenish Raja as Gul Bano
 Tauqeer Nasir as Malik
 Behroz Sabzwari as Jehangir
 Haris Waheed as Hannan
 Seemi Pasha 
 Alizeh Shah as Shafaq
 Syeda Palwasha Yahya Shah as Nishwa
 Shehzeen Rahat as Saman
 Uzma Beg as Haleema
 Faisal Naqvi
 Zainab Qayyum as Gushan Araa
 Munazzah Arif as Fatima
 Tahira Erum
 Abul Hasan
 Ayesha Khan as Sania's mother	
 Muhammad Haris
 Usama Khan as Adil
 Hammad Siddiq
 Imran Hassan as Hadeed
 Mussarrat Parveen
 Rabia Kiran
 Rameez Alam Siddiqui
 Sajeeruddin Khalifa as Ilyas' brother
 Tanveer Hussain Malik

Soundtrack 

The title song was sung by Sanwal Esakhelvi. The music was composed by Shuja Hyder and the lyrics were written by Sabir Zafar.

References

External links 
 Hum TV official website
 YouTube playlist

Pakistani drama television series
2018 Pakistani television series debuts